Muteki is a Japanese adult video company which specializes in casting mainstream entertainers, usually gravure idols or mainstream actresses, in their adult video debuts. It is part of the Hokuto Corporation's roster of companies. The label's first movie was released in September 2008.

Entertainers who have worked under this label include film actresses Yoko Shimada, Tsugumi, Mai Gotō, Chiharu Komatsu, stage actress Chiaki Minase, gravure idols Kimika Yoshino, Fuko, Haruna Hana, Megu Fujiura, and singers Sachiko Suzuki and Akie Harada. Several former members of the AKB48 group have also had their debut at Muteki like Risa Naruse (as Osaka Haruna), former SKE48 member Momona Kitō (Yua Mikami) and Rumi Yonezawa. While most debuts at Muteki were limited to one or a few films, the studio also started the AV career's of many high profiled and famous actresses including Hana Haruna, Kaori, Rika Hoshimi, Emiri Okazaki, Yuri Oshikawa and Usa Miharu. Other famous debutees include former NMB48 trainee member Rikaso Okada (as Miko Matsuda) and former Bakusute Sotokanda Icchome member Yu Ito (as Sakura Moko), both of whom were later members of Yua Mikami's own idol group Honey Popcorn.

On December 1, 2018, for Muteki's 10 anniversary, the studio released These Two Have No Equal (TEK-097) co-starring their most famous debutees: Yua Mikami and Shoko Takahashi). The four-hour film was released along with a 3D VR film also starring Mikami and Takahashi. It became one of the label's highest selling film and the second highest selling Japanese adult film of 2018.

Filmography

References

External links 
  

Japanese companies established in 2008
Film production companies of Japan
Japanese pornographic film studios
Mass media companies established in 2008